Briagolong is a town in the Australian state of Victoria, located 20 kilometres north of Maffra and some 270 kilometres east of Melbourne, in the Shire of Wellington region of Gippsland. At the 2016 census, Briagolong had a population of 1,081.

History
Briagolong Post Office opened on 1 May 1871.

The town's principal industry has been timber, and it supplied red gum paving blocks for the streets of Melbourne, and stringybark for the flooring in Australia House in London.

A railway branch line from Maffra opened in 1889 and was closed in 1952.

The town's local cricket team (the Saints) were crowned Sale-Maffra Cricket Association 2018/19 season premiers.

Briagolong has a pub, which serves meals and drinks. It was established in 1880.

Today

Briagolong was the home town of Private Jake Kovco, Australia's first military casualty in the Iraq War. Private Kovco's funeral was held in Briagolong on 2 May 2006, and was attended by Prime Minister John Howard, Defence Minister Brendan Nelson, Defence Force Chief Angus Houston and Army Chief Peter Leahy.

In conjunction with neighbouring township Boisdale, Briagolong has an Australian Rules football team in the East Gippsland Football League.

The town's water supply is taken from the Freestone Creek.

Popular tourist areas nearby are the swimming areas on the Freestone Creek at Quarry Reserve (4.5 km north of Briagolong) and Blue Pool (10 km north), both on the Freestone Creek Road.

Notable people
 Irving Mosquito, Australian rules footballer

References

Towns in Victoria (Australia)
Shire of Wellington